The Navy League refers to various organisations worldwide:

The Leagues themselves

 Navy League of Great Britain (not usually seen with "of Great Britain" in the title), refers to the original United Kingdom organisation (now merged with The Marine Society) responsible for the Sea Cadet Corps and the Girls' Nautical Training Corps

Also:
 Navy League of Australia
 Navy League of Canada
 Navy League (Germany) in Imperial Germany
 Navy League of New Zealand
 Navy League of the United States
 Navy League of Brazil (Liga Maritima)

Cadet organisations with Navy League roots

Boys
Navy League Cadet Corps (USA), The NLCC is the younger version of the United States Naval Sea Cadet Corps
Navy League Cadet Officers (Canada), Navy League Cadet Officers are volunteers that work for the Navy League Cadet Programme
Navy League Cadet Programme (Canada), Cadet organisation
Sea Cadet Corps (United Kingdom)

Girls
Girls' Nautical Training Corps or GNTC
Navy League Wrennette Corp, Canadian girls' Cadet organisation